The 1982 Norwegian Football Cup was the 77th edition of the Norwegian annual knockout football tournament. The Cup was won by Brann after beating Molde in the cup final with the score 3–2. This was Brann's fifth Norwegian Cup title.

First round

|colspan="3" style="background-color:#97DEFF"|25 May 1982

|-
|colspan="3" style="background-color:#97DEFF"|26 May 1982

|-
|colspan="3" style="background-color:#97DEFF"|27 May 1982

|-
|colspan="3" style="background-color:#97DEFF"|28 May 1982

|-
|colspan="3" style="background-color:#97DEFF"|Replay: 2 June 1982

|-
|colspan="3" style="background-color:#97DEFF"|Replay: 3 June 1982

|}

Second round

|colspan="3" style="background-color:#97DEFF"|22 June 1982

|-
|colspan="3" style="background-color:#97DEFF"|23 June 1982

|-
|colspan="3" style="background-color:#97DEFF"|24 June 1982

|}

Third round

|colspan="3" style="background-color:#97DEFF"|1 July 1982

|-
|colspan="3" style="background-color:#97DEFF"|2 July 1982

|-
|colspan="3" style="background-color:#97DEFF"|3 July 1982

|-
|colspan="3" style="background-color:#97DEFF"|4 July 1982

|-
|colspan="3" style="background-color:#97DEFF"|6 July 1982

|-
|colspan="3" style="background-color:#97DEFF"|7 July 1982

|-
|colspan="3" style="background-color:#97DEFF"|Replay: 8 July 1982

|}

Fourth round

|colspan="3" style="background-color:#97DEFF"|25 July 1982

|-
|colspan="3" style="background-color:#97DEFF"|28 July 1982

|}

Quarter-finals

|colspan="3" style="background-color:#97DEFF"|25 August 1982

|-
|colspan="3" style="background-color:#97DEFF"|Replay: 1 September 1982

|}

Semi-finals

|colspan="3" style="background-color:#97DEFF"|19 September 1982

|}

Final

Brann's winning team:  Stein Norstad,  Hans Brandtun, Bjørn Erik Brandt, Tore Strand, Asgeir Kleppa, 
Geir Austvik, Kjell Rune Pedersen (Terje Rolland 83), Arne Møller, Neil MacLeod,  
Ingvar Dalhaug (Øyvind Pettersen 64) and Finn Krogh.

Molde's team: Inge Bratteteig, Tor M. Hagbø, Bertil Stranden, Ulrich Møller, 
Per Arne Aase, Geir Malmedal, Rune Ulvestad, Ivar Helge Mittet, Stein Olav Hestad, Jan Berg and 
Steinar Henden.

References
  www.brann.no

External links
http://www.rsssf.no

Norwegian Football Cup seasons
Norway
Football Cup